Tomichia is a genus of very small freshwater snails which have a gill and an operculum, gastropod mollusks or micromollusks in the family Tomichiidae.

Distribution
The distribution of the genus Tomichia includes South Africa and Eastern Zaire. Tomichia is the only genus of Pomatiopsidae in Africa.

Ecology
This genus occurs is both freshwater and brackish water. There exist halophilic species of Tomichia which live in saline lakes such as Tomichia ventricosa.

Species
Brown (1994) recognized 10 species (7 in South Africa and 3 in Central Africa) and one undescribed species. Kameda & Kato (2011) recognized 11 species of Tomichia.

Species within the genus Tomichia include:
 Tomichia cawstoni Connolly, 1939
 Tomichia differens Connolly, 1939
 Tomichia guillemei Leloup, 1953
 Tomichia hendrickxi (Verdcourt, 1950)
 Tomichia kivuensis Mandahl-Barth, 1974
 Tomichia natalensis Connolly, 1939
 Tomichia rogersi (Connolly, 1929)
 Tomichia tristis (Morelet, 1889) - critically endangered
 Tomichia ventricosa (Reeve, 1842) - type species
 Tomichia zwellendamensis (Küster, 1852)
 (?)Tomichia n.sp. - reported by Cohen (1986) from Lake Turkana

References

External links
 Davis G. M. (1981). "Different Modes of Evolution and Adaptive Radiation in the Pomatiopsidae (Prosobranchia: Mesogastropoda)". Malacologia 21(1-2): 209-262.
 Verdcourt B. (1951). "The distribution of the genus Tomichia Benson in Africa". Revue de Zoologie et de Botanique Africaines 44: 173-174.
 Verdcourt B. (1960). "A further collection of Tomichia hendrickxi (Verdcourt) from the Belgian Congo". Basteria 24: 3.

Truncatelloidea